Illinois Route 117 is a rural north–south state route in north central Illinois. It travels from Interstate 74 in the small community of Goodfield to Illinois Route 17 in Toluca.

Route description 
Illinois 117 is a rural, two lane surface road for its entire length. The main cities of service on Illinois 117 are Eureka and Roanoke. In Eureka, Illinois 117 is known as Main Street, and intersects with U.S. Route 24 (Center Street).

Through Roanoke, Illinois 117 is called Front Street. Northeast of Roanoke, Illinois 116/117 runs on top of an abandoned rail line until it turns north towards Toluca.

History 

Though Illinois 117 now connects to Illinois 17, they were originally unconnected, and each were separately planned in State Bond Issue sequence. SBI Route 117 originally ran from U.S. Route 150 (just north of current I-74) in Goodfield to Illinois 116 north of Eureka. On January 8, 1993, it was extended north through Roanoke and north to Toluca to renumber IL 116A, the last surviving letter route in Illinois.

Major intersections

References

External links

117
117
117